is a 1915 Japanese autobiographical novel by Sōseki Natsume. It is his only autobiographical work of fiction, and his last completed work. Together with Kokoro (1914), Grass on the Wayside is often cited as Natsume's major literary effort.

Plot
After having returned from England, Kenzō, an egocentric, emotionally detached man in his thirties, teaches English literature at Tokyo Imperial University. His wife Osumi, with whom he constantly argues, is pregnant with their third child, and to facilitate their monetary situation, he starts writing articles for magazines until late in the night. While he holds neither one of his siblings in high regard, he supports his older, sickly half-sister Onatsu with a monthly income, although she is herself married (her husband Hida is rumoured to spend his money on a mistress), and also lends money to his older brother Chōtarō. One day, Kenzō is approached by his former adoptive father Shimada, who asks him for his financial support. Kenzō remembers his secured but loveless childhood at his possessive foster parents' home, where he lived between the age of two and eight. When Shimada divorced his wife Otsune and remarried, Kenzō first lived with Otsune before returning to his natural parents, where he was regarded as a burden. Although reluctantly, Kenzō repeatedly gives Shimada the sums he asks for, commented on disparagingly by Osumi. In a final agreement reached between the two men and their emissaries, Kenzō pays Shimada 100 yen, with Shimada in return signing a document declaring that he will never make contact with Kenzō again.

Characters
 Kenzō: a professor for English literature
 Osumi: Kenzō's wife
 Shimada: Kenzō's former foster father
 Otsune: Shimada's first wife and Kenzō's former foster mother
 Onatsu: Kenzō's older sister
 Hida: Onatsu's husband
 Chōtarō: Kenzō's older brother
 Ofuji: Shimada's second wife
 Shibano: Ofuji's former husband
 Onui: Ofuji's and Shibano's daughter
 Kenzō's father-in-law

Biographical background
Natsume's novel describes the short time between his return from England in 1903 and the beginning of his career as a writer. Like his literary alter ego Kenzō, Natsume was a professor for English literature at Tokyo Imperial University and wrote for literary magazines in his spare time.

Release history
Grass on the Wayside first appeared in serialised form in the Asahi Shimbun between 3 June 1915 and 10 September 1915. A book publication by Iwanami Shoten followed the same year. Edwin McClellan's English translation appeared in 1969.

References

20th-century Japanese literature
Japanese novels
Japanese autobiographical novels
Japanese serial novels
Novels by Natsume Sōseki
Works by Japanese writers
1915 novels